The Durrant Baronetcy, of Scottow in the County of Norfolk, is a title in the Baronetage of Great Britain. It was created on 22 January 1784 for Thomas Durrant, High Sheriff of Norfolk in 1784.

Durrant baronets, of Scottow (1784)
Sir Thomas Durrant, 1st Baronet (–1790)
Sir Thomas Durrant, 2nd Baronet (1775–1829)
Sir Henry Thomas Estridge Durrant, 3rd Baronet (1807–1861)
Sir Henry Josias Durrant, 4th Baronet (1838–1875)
Sir William Robert Estridge Durrant, 5th Baronet (1840–1912)
Sir William Henry Estridge Durrant, 6th Baronet (1872–1953)
Sir William Henry Estridge Durrant, 7th Baronet (1901–1994)
Sir William Alexander Estridge Durrant, 8th Baronet (1929–2018)
Sir David Alexander Durrant, 9th Baronet (born 1960)

The heir apparent is the current holder's eldest son, Alexander Llewelyn Estridge Durrant (b. 1990).

Notes

References
Kidd, Charles, Williamson, David (editors). Debrett's Peerage and Baronetage (1990 edition). New York: St Martin's Press, 1990, 

Durrant
1784 establishments in Great Britain